Vicki Hansford (born 31 October 1979) is a retired British Paralympic rower who competed in international level events. She was also a track athlete at national level.

Hansford lost her right leg due to sarcoma.

References

1979 births
Living people
Sportspeople from Woking
Paralympic rowers of Great Britain
British female rowers
English female rowers
Rowers at the 2008 Summer Paralympics
Medalists at the 2008 Summer Paralympics
Paralympic medalists in rowing
Paralympic bronze medalists for Great Britain